The Junior detective series TKKG is a German series of audio dramas and novels created by "Stefan Wolf", a pseudonym used by Rolf Kalmuczak.

The characters and their creator 

In all German-speaking countries they are the most commercially successful series of novels of their type, apart from The Three Investigators.  They call themselves TKKG,  after the initials of their names:  Tarzan (later renamed in Tim due to the name "Tarzan" being trademarked), Karl, Dumpling (in German , in Austria called "Klumpling") and Gab(b)y;  an unofficial fifth member is Gaby's Cocker Spaniel, called Oskar.  Since 1979 they continually solve all sorts of crimes, from thefts and robberies to kidnappings and terrorism.

The books were written by Rolf Kalmuczak, under his pen name Stefan Wolf. In June 2004 TKKG changed their publisher from Pelican to CBJ - They published volumes 07, 14, 54, 77 and 84 in January 2005 as a new edition with the CBJ brand name.

Tim
Peter Timotheus Carsten, which is his full name (just called Tim, which is short for Timotheus, after Tarzan had to be replaced) is the leader of the TKKG gang, who are named after the initial letters of their names or nicknames. Tim is 14, but mentally and physically far ahead. A tanned athlete, he particularly enjoys judo (he has a brown belt) and volleyball. For two years (at the beginning of the series) he's been living in a famous boarding school, and is pupil of class 9b. His father, an engineer, had a fatal accident when Tim was only 6 years old. Tim's mother, a book-keeper, works hard to earn enough money for the expensive school money for their son. Tim loves adventure and hates injustice, and has a big crush on Gabby, of whom he is very protective.

Previously, Tim was originally called Tarzan by his friends because of his athletic prowess, but he did not want to be compared with this 'half-finished bodybuilder' after he had seen a very bad movie about him (the change actually came about because the name Tarzan is trademarked).

Karl
The smartest of the quartet, Karl Vierstein is sometimes nicknamed Computer because he has an eidetic memory; whatever he's read he never forgets - perhaps because his father is a professor for Maths at the local university.

He goes into the same class as Tim, but he does not live at the boarding school. He is tall and lanky, but not athletic. He is nearsighted and is virtually helpless without his glasses, which he polishes whenever he's nervous.

Dumpling
(German nickname: "", which means "dumpling". Klößchen is called Klumpling in Austrian audio book editions and in the official English translation of the movies. Mostly this is because the K is needed to form the TKKG brand.)

His actual name is Willi Sauerlich. He lives together with Tim at the boarding school, where they share a room. His parents are rich - his father owns a chocolate ware company - but Willi likes to spend more time with his friends.

His nickname is derived from his passion for chocolate; he never can keep his fingers off anything sweet. Therefore, he grows steadily bigger around the hips. Nevertheless, he is a reliable comrade, and having a rich father as an asset has proven useful time and again. Dumpling secretly wishes to be as athletic and sprightly as his friend Tim.

Willi is actually also quite close with his father, mainly because of their common desire to eat well; Mrs. Sauerlich is a very strict vegetarian who makes them eat anything vegetable - and only vegetable. So the two keep a secret stash of the good things in the cellar, where they help themselves whenever they have the chance.

Gaby
Gabriele Glockner (in Austrian audio book editions she is called "Gabby" with a double "b") is affectionately nicknamed "" ("Paw") by her friends because she loves animals and makes every animal - particularly dogs - shake paws with her. She is the daughter of police commissioner Emil Glockner and his wife Margot, who runs a small grocery store. Like Karl, she lives with her parents in town and attends Tim's boarding school only for lessons. She is very good at English and backstroking.

With her golden blonde hair and blue eyes with long eyelashes, she is quite pretty. Actually, she is also quite close to Tim, although she rarely shows it as much as he does.

Oskar
The mascot of the group is Gaby's black and white cocker spaniel. He accompanies the group practically anywhere.

The town with millions of inhabitants / "town of millions" 

The homeland of the TKKG gang is a fictitious town with millions of inhabitants somewhere in Germany.  There  the TKKG gang live and go to school.  Tim, however, comes from a city which is a four-hour drive away.
While there are speculations amongst fans that the town is actually Munich, mostly due to the usage of typical southern german vocabulary in the series as well as the "towns of millions" being stated to be the capital city of a german state, Kalmuczak frequently dismissed these as false, claiming that the similarities were purely coincidental.

Radio dramas 
The series has appeared since 1981 with the radio play label Europa 
179 audio books were recorded and released (since 1981).

Actors 

Narrators: Günther Dockerill (Episodes 1 to 56), Eric Vaessen (Episodes 57 to 60), Günter König (year 1998 / Episodes 61 to 110), Wolfgang Kaven (since Episode 111)
Tim/Tarzan (Peter Carsten): Sascha Draeger
Karl Vierstein: Niki Nowotny (Episodes 1 to 197), Tobias Diakow (since Episode 198)
Klößchen (Willi Sauerlich): Manou Lubowski
Gaby (Gabriele Glockner): Veronika Neugebauer (Episodes 1 to 43, 53 to 166), Scarlet Lubowski (Episodes 44 to 52), Rhea Harder (since Episode 167)
Inspector Glockner: Wolfgang Draeger (Episodes 1 to 36), Edgar Bessen (Episodes 37 onward)

Episode list 

By 2017 202 audiobooks have appeared, as well as three special episodes (The secret of TKKG (1995, re-issue 2010), Treasure island with seven secrets):

TKKG on television and in cinema 
see Ein Fall für TKKG
Between 1985 and 1987 TKKG was developed for ZDF a twelve episode TV cartoon serial.  The first six episodes were shown between 7 November 1985 and 12 December 1985 on ZDF.  Episodes 7 - 12 had also been broadcast on ZDF two years later between 22 October 1987 and 26 November 1987 for the first time.  Afterwards all episodes in irregular order were broadcast on ZDF and on KI.KA. (There. among other things. in the context of the broadcast "TKKG - Der Club der Detektive").  In the main roles, Fabian Harloff started from episode 7 as Tim, Christian Pfaff as Karl, Kai Maahs as Doughnut and Jessica Gast as Gaby.

 Das leere Grab im Moor
 Angst in der 9 A
 Die Jagd nach den Millionendieben
 Der Schlangenmensch
 Das Geheimnis der chinesischen Vase
 Der blinde Hellseher
 Überfall im Hafen
 Bestien in der Finternis
 Spion auf der Flucht
 Gangster auf der Gartenparty
 Haie an Bord
 Todesfracht im Jaguar

Movies in Cinema
 Drachenauge (The Dragon's Eye) (1992)
 TKKG- The Mysterious Mind-Machine (German title: TKKG und das Geheimnis um die rätselhafte Mind Machine) (2006)

The 2006 movie about the mysterious mind machine was produced by Constantin Film and was directed by Tomy Wigand.

 TKKG (2019)

Comics 

1987–1989 appeared in Ehapa publishing house of 17 booklets with TKKG Comics (expenditure 1-2/1987, 1-12/1988 and 1-3/1989).  The Comics was produced by the studio Comicon, a draughtsman was Josep Marti, who also among other things for YPS drew.

TKKG in other countries

France 
In France, thirteen TKKG books have been published in French from 1981 to 1985. The names of the main characters have been slightly changed : Tarzan, Karl, Klaus, Gaby.

Indonesia 
In Indonesia, TKKG books are translated to Indonesian. The names of all the main characters have been changed to facilitate the locals to pronounce the names. The series is known as "STOP", which represents the acronym of the altered names of the main characters:

 Sporty (Tim in the original version)
 Thomas (Karl in the original version)
 Oskar (Klößchen in the original version) 
 Petra (Gaby in the original version)

The first 9 computer games were translated into English (the first 3 were sold in English-speaking countries; the last 6 were not and were translated for educational reasons). TKKG was kept as the names, but changed;

 Tim became Tiger, or Peter Carsten.
 Karl became Kevin Forestone or the Computer.
 Gaby became Katy Crocker, or the Paw.
 Klößchen became Grunter, or Basil Sowerby.

External links 
 TKKG Fanpage 
 TKKG forum & Fanpage
 Lists of episodes in the TV serial 
 IMDB entry on the 1992 film 

German children's novels
Audio plays
Children's mystery novels
Series of children's books